These British Pullman carriages are preserved, or have continued to operate on the main line beyond their original service life:

Early Pullman cars

Pullman 1910–1922 cars

Pullman 1923–1931 cars

Pullman 1932 cars

Pullman 1951 cars

Pullman 1960 cars

Pullman 1966 cars

Pullman 1985 cars

See also

 George Pullman
 Pullman Company (USA)
 GWR Super Saloons
 Clerestory, Wikipedia article on Railway Coach roof design following the Pullman American influence.

References

British Rail passenger services
Pullman Company
 
British Transport Commission
British Rail coaching stock